The final tournament was held in Netherlands and Poland from 23 September to 15 October 2022.

Serbia won their second title for the consecutive edition, beating Brazil in straight sets.

First round
 The top four teams in each pool will qualify for the second phase.

Pool A

Total matches played : 15
Total sets played : 50 (3.33 per match)
Total points played : 2,158 (144 per match)

Pool B

Total matches played : 15
Total sets played : 56 (3.73 per match)
Total points played : 2,394 (160 per match)

Pool C

Total matches played : 15
Total sets played : 52 (3.47 per match)
Total points played : 2,241 (149 per match)

Pool D

Total matches played : 15
Total sets played : 52 (3.47 per match)
Total points played : 2,300 (153 per match)

Second round
 The top four teams will qualify for the final phase.

Pool E

Total matches played : 16
Total sets played : 57 (3.56 per match)
Total points played : 2,474 (155 per match)

Pool F

Total matches played : 16
Total sets played : 61 (3.81 per match)
Total points played : 2,709 (169 per match)

Final round

Total matches played  : 8
Total sets played : 31 (3.88 per match)
Total points played : 1,375 (172 per match)

Tournament statistics

Host cities
Netherlands :  Arnhem, Rotterdam, Apeldoorn
Poland : Gdańsk, Łódź, Gliwice

Venues
Arnhem : GelreDome (21,248)
Rotterdam : Rotterdam Ahoy (16,426)
Apeldoorn : Omnisport (6,525)
Gdańsk : Ergo Arena (11,409)
Łódź : Atlas Arena (13,805)
Gliwice : Gliwice Arena (13,752)

Attendance
 Matches played : 100
 Attendance (first round) (played 60) : 120,879 (2,015 per match)
 Attendance (second round) (played 32) : 68,430 (2,138 per match)
 Attendance (final round) (played 8) : 42,206 (5,276 per match)
 Total attendance on tournament : 231,515 (2,315 per match)

 Arena GelreDome  total attendance (played 39) : 91,359 (2,343 per match)
 Arena Rotterdam Ahoy total attendance (played 16) : 31,115 (1,945 per match)
 Arena Omnisport total attendance (played 5) : 26,587 (5,317 per match)
 Ergo Arena total attendance (played 12) : 25,515 (2,126 per match)
 Atlas Arena total attendance (played 25) : 41,320 (1,653 per match)
 Gliwice Arena total attendance (played 3) : 15,619 (5,206 per match)

 Most attendance : 10,000 -  v. , GelreDome, Arnhem on 30 September 2022.10,000 -  v. , GelreDome, Arnhem on 1 October 2022. 10,000 -  v. , GelreDome, Arnhem on 2 October 2022.
 Fewest attendance : 101 -  v. , Atlas Arena, Łódź on 4 October 2022.

Matches
 Most matches wins : 12 - 
 Most matches lost : 7 - 
 Fewest matches lost : 0 - 
 Longest match played (duration) : 137 min. -  vs.  (2h,17m)
 Shortest match played (duration) : 58 min. -  vs.  (0h,58m) 58 min. -  vs.  (0h,58m) 58 min. -  vs.  (0h,58m)

Sets
 Total sets (first round)  : 210 (3.50 per match)
 Total sets (second round)  : 118 (3.69 per match)
 Total sets (final round)  : 31 (3.88 per match)
 Total sets  scored : 359 (3.60 per match)
 Most sets played : 45 -  (31/14)
 Most sets wins : 36 -  (36/5)
 Fewest sets wins : 0 - ,  
 Most sets lost : 24 -  (8/24)
 Fewest sets lost : 5 - 
 Most 5 sets played : 4 -  (2/2)
 Most 5 sets win : 2 -  (2/1),  (2/1),  (2/1),  (2/2)
 Most 5 sets lost : 3 -  (0/3)
 Highest set ratio : 7.200 -  (36/5)
 Lowest set ratio : 0.000 - ,  (0/15)

Points
 Total points (first round)  : 9,093 (152 per match)
 Total points (second round)  : 5,183 (162 per match)
 Total points (final round)  : 1,375 (172 per match)
 Total points scored  : 15,651 (157 per match)
 Most points wins : 1,057 - 
 Fewest points wins : 237 - 
 Most points lost : 908 - 
 Fewest points lost : 375 - 
 Most points played in match : 221 -  vs.  2 : 3 (111/110)
 Fewest points played in match : 113 -  vs.  3 : 0 (75/38), 113 -  vs.  3 : 0 (75/38)
 Highest points score in set (excluding 5th set) : 60 -  vs.  (29/31),  vs.  (29/31)
 Lowest points score in set (excluding 5th set) : 33 -  vs.  (25/8)
 Highest point ratio : 1.201 -  (1039/865),  (993/827),
 Lowest point ratio : 0.629 -  (237/377)

Squads

Teams 
Total teams : 24
Total players : 336 (14 per team)

Players 
 Appearance record: Karina Ocasio  participated in the World Championship for the sixth time.

Multiple World Championships

Final standing
 Champions   Runners up   Third place   Fourth place

|- 
|colspan=12| Teams eliminated in quarterfinals

|- 
|colspan=12| Teams eliminated in second round

|- 
|colspan=12| Teams eliminated in first round

|}
Source: WCH 2022 final standings

Statistics leaders

Awards

Most Valuable Player

Best Setter

Best Outside Spikers

Best Opposite Spiker

Best Middle Blockers

Best Libero

See also

2022 FIVB Volleyball Men's World Championship statistics
FIVB Volleyball Women's Nations League statistics
FIVB Volleyball Men's Nations League statistics
Volleyball records and statistics
Major achievements in volleyball by nation
List of Indoor Volleyball World Medalists

References

External links
Fédération Internationale de Volleyball – official website
2022 Women's World Championship – official website
Teams
Competition formula
History
Honours
Previous Edition

statistics
Volleyball records and statistics